Gregor Žugelj (born 2 September 1991) is a Slovenian footballer who plays as a midfielder.

Playing career

Slovenia 
Žugelj began his professional career in 2009 in the Slovenian PrvaLiga with NK Olimpija Ljubljana. He would later be loaned out to the lower tiers in order to receive playing time. Initially, he was loaned in 2010 to the Slovenian Third League to play with NK Kamnik. He received a second loan spell with NK Bela Krajina in the Slovenian Second League, and consequently signed a permanent deal in 2012. He departed from Bela Krajina after the conclusion of the season.

Following his departure from Krajina, he managed to return to the Slovenian top tier in 2014 by signing with NK Krka. He managed to make his debut in the Prva Liga and appeared in 5 matches. Kirka re-signed him for an additional season where he once again appeared in 5 matches for the club. In 2015, he played abroad in the Landesliga Burgenland with SV St. Margarethen/Rosental. After a season in Austria, he departed in the winter of 2016. In 2016, Žugelj returned to the Slovenian third division to play with NK Kolpa.

Canada 
After the relegation of Kolpa in 2018, he played abroad for the second time this time in Canada where he initially played indoor soccer in the Arena Premier League with Croatia AC. After the conclusion of the 2017-18 winter season, he transitioned back into the outdoor format by playing in the Canadian Soccer League with SC Waterloo Region. In his debut season with Waterloo, he helped the club secure a playoff berth by finishing third in the First Division. He also assisted the club in reaching the second round of the playoffs where they were eliminated by FC Vorkuta.

Waterloo re-signed Žugelj for the 2019 season. Once more he helped the club qualify for the postseason and recorded a goal against FC Ukraine United in the second round but were eliminated.

After a year's absence, he returned to the CSL to sign with St. Catharines Hrvat in 2021. He recorded a hattrick on 14 September 2021, against Euru Academy. He also finished as the club's top goalscorer with 4 goals.

References 

1991 births
Living people
Footballers from Ljubljana
Slovenian footballers
Association football midfielders
NK Olimpija Ljubljana (2005) players
NK Krka players
NK Bela Krajina players
SC Waterloo Region players
Slovenian PrvaLiga players
Canadian Soccer League (1998–present) players
Slovenian Second League players